Samantha Taylor (born 1958) is a Canadian TV host.

Samantha Taylor or Sam Taylor may also refer to:
 The Cardcaptors name for the Cardcaptor Sakura character Sonomi Daidouji 
 Samantha Claire Taylor (born 1975), British cricketer
 Samantha Taylor (equestrian) (born 1983), Canadian equestrian
 Sam Taylor (film producer), British film producer, co-founder of Film and Music Entertainment
 Sam Taylor-Johnson (born 1967), British filmmaker, photographer and visual artist

See also 
 Sam Taylor (disambiguation)